"Die Bosniaken kommen" (English: "The Bosniaks are Coming") is a military march, which was composed by Austrian composer Eduard Wagnes in 1895. It was composed in Graz in honour of the soldiers of the Bosnian-Herzegovinian Infantry, who were in the Austro-Hungarian army. This is one of the most popular military marches, and today is played on all military events in Austria.

See also
Bosnian-Herzegovinian Infantry
Bosniaks
Mehter
World War I

March music
1895 compositions
Bosniak history
Austro-Hungarian rule in Bosnia and Herzegovina